The 2016 West Virginia Democratic presidential primary was held on May 10 in the U.S. state of West Virginia as one of the Democratic Party's primaries ahead of the 2016 presidential election.

The Republican Party held primaries in two states, including their own West Virginia primary, while for the Democratic Party this was the only primary on that day.

In a heavily white, working-class state where voters were angry about the Obama administration's policies, Bernie Sanders easily outpolled Clinton. Thirty percent of Democratic primary voters came from a coal household, and Sanders won 63 percent of these.

Opinion polling

Results

County results

Analysis 
Although West Virginia had breathed new life into Clinton's 2008 presidential campaign eight years earlier, it failed to deliver for Clinton's front-running campaign in 2016. Clinton lost every county in the state to Bernie Sanders.

Sanders's West Virginia victory came from strong support among workers in the coal industry; fifty-five percent of West Virginia's Democratic voters with coal workers in their households voted for Sanders, while only 29 percent voted for Clinton. His easy win was likely fueled by Clinton's comments in March about coal, "We're going to put a lot of coal miners and coal companies out of business."

Analysts speculated Sanders's win in West Virginia came not from support for his own coal policies, but from a rejection of the Obama administration's. Sanders was also helped by large numbers of Republican cross-over voters. Thirty-nine percent of Sanders voters stated they planned to vote for Donald Trump over Sanders in the November general election.

References 

West Virginia
Democratic primary
2016
May 2016 events in the United States